Pepper Island may refer to:
Pepper Island (Mohawk River), island in United States
 Peberholm, artificial island in Denmark
 Cockspur Island, originally known as Pepper Island
 Îles Poivre  (Pepper Islands), in the Seychelles
 Langkawi , was once known to British mariners as Pepper Island, a translation of the Achinese Pulau Lada (or Pulo Ladda)
The name is believed to come from  felfel, the Arabic for a peppercorn.